Patrick Murphy (born 22 February 1984) is an Australian sprint freestyle and backstroke swimmer. He is an Australian relay team veteran since 2005. He has four FINA world championship medals and two Olympic bronze medals. He was an Australian Institute of Sport scholarship holder.

In April 2014, Murphy was named an Athlete Role Model for the 2014 Summer Youth Olympics in Nanjing, China.

See also 
 List of Olympic medalists in swimming (men)

References

1984 births
Living people
Olympic swimmers of Australia
Swimmers at the 2008 Summer Olympics
Olympic bronze medalists for Australia
Australian male backstroke swimmers
Olympic bronze medalists in swimming
Australian male freestyle swimmers
World Aquatics Championships medalists in swimming
Australian Institute of Sport swimmers
Medalists at the 2008 Summer Olympics
Swimmers at the 2004 Summer Olympics
Universiade bronze medalists for Australia
Universiade medalists in swimming
Medalists at the 2003 Summer Universiade
Sportspeople from Albury
Sportsmen from New South Wales